Golem, the Spirit of the Exile (also known as Golem, the Ghost of Exile) is a 1992 drama film directed by Amos Gitai. It is a European co-production between Germany, Netherlands, United Kingdom, France and Italy.

Following  Esther and Berlin - Jerusalem, the film is the third chapter in the Gitai's "Exile" trilogy; it is also the middle chapter in the director's Golem trilogy, between documentary films Birth of a Golem and Golem, le jardin pétrifié.

Cast 

 Hanna Schygulla as the Spirit of the Exile
 Vittorio Mezzogiorno  as the Maharal
 Ophrah Shemesh  as  Naomi
 Samuel Fuller  as  Elimelek
 Mireille Perrier  as  Ruth
 Sotigui Kouyaté  as  Boaz
 Fabienne Babe  as  Orpa 
 Bakary Sangaré  as the first marine
 Alain Maratrat as the second marine
 Marceline Loridan Ivens as the Mother of Opra
 Bernardo Bertolucci as the master of the court
 Philippe Garrel as  Opra's fiancé 
 Marisa Paredes as the Mistress of Ceremony

References

External links

1992 films
Italian drama films
1992 drama films
Films directed by Amos Gitai
French drama films
German drama films
British drama films
Dutch drama films
1990s British films
1990s French films
1990s German films